John Castell (a.k.a. John Castle) (c. 1380 – 1426) was a Master of University College, Oxford, and later a Chancellor of the University of Oxford.
Castell was a Fellow of University College. He became Master of the College circa 1408. He also held preferment in the Diocese of York with his mastership. In 1411, a sentence of excommunication was issued by the Archbishop of Canterbury, Thomas Arundel, against Castell, Fellows at the College — Robert Burton (later Master of the College), John Hamerton, and Adam Redyford — and the College as a whole, due to Lollardy leanings. An appeal to the Pope against the excommunication was made by the bursar of the College, John Ryvell. Castell survived the controversy and continued as Master until 1420.

John Castell was appointed a King's Clerk in 1420. In 1421, he became Chancellor of Oxford University, a position he held until 1426.

See also
 Secretary of State (England)
 Master of University College, Oxford
 Chancellor of Oxford University

References

1380 births
1426 deaths
15th-century English people
15th-century scholars
Fellows of University College, Oxford
Masters of University College, Oxford
Secretaries of State of the Kingdom of England
Chancellors of the University of Oxford
15th-century English writers

Year of birth uncertain